Ralph Barton (1891–1931) was an American cartoonist and caricaturist.

Ralph Barton may also refer to:

Ralph Barton (MP), Member of Parliament (MP) for Nottingham and Wigan

See also
Ralph Barton Perry (1876–1957), American philosopher